The Sixfold Expanse of Samantabhadra is one of the Seventeen tantras of Dzogchen Upadesha.

Primary resources
kun tu bzang po klong drug pa'i rgyud @ Wikisource in Wylie
ཀུན་ཏུ་བཟང་པོ་ཀློང་དྲུག་པའི་རྒྱུད @ Wikisource in Uchen (Tibetan Script), Unicode

Notes

Dzogchen texts
Nyingma tantras